Montville Public Schools is the school district of Montville, Connecticut.

Schools
 Montville High School
 Leonard J. Tyl Middle School
 Mohegan Elementary School
 Dr. Charles E. Murphy Elementary School
 Oakdale Elementary School

References

External links
 Montville Public Schools
School districts in Connecticut
Education in New London County, Connecticut
Montville, Connecticut